William Sansom Vaux (May 19, 1811 – May 5, 1882) was an American mineralogist from Pennsylvania.

Early life
Vaux was born in Philadelphia to George and Eliza H. Vaux. His parents were early Quaker settlers of the Province of Pennsylvania and amassed great wealth through their businesses.  He inherited his parents wealth after their deaths and never engaged in business.  His inheritance allowed him to dedicate his time toward the study of science and mineralogy in particular.

Career
He became a member of the Academy of Natural Sciences in 1834, and served it in various capacities in the next forty-eight years, including vice-president. He was also a member of the Zoological Society of Philadelphia and one of the original members of the American Association for the Advancement of Science. He was elected to the American Philosophical Society in 1859.

Vaux made several trips to Europe to collect mineral specimens, and by his death his collection was considered to be the finest in the United States.

Vaux was one of eight founders of the Numismatic and Antiquarian Society of Philadelphia and served as vice-president. From 1871 till his death he was treasurer of the American Association for the Advancement of Science. Vaux also served as president of the Zoological Society of Philadelphia.

Personal life
Vaux was married but his wife died several years before him.  They had one son together, however he died at an early age. Vaux became infirm toward the end of his life from a disease contracted from travelling in Rome.  He died of a tumor-like growth in his abdomen and was interred at Laurel Hill Cemetery.

Legacy
He bequeathed his mineral and archaeological collections to the Academy of Natural Sciences, along with his library and an endowment for their preservation.

He is commemorated in the name of Vaux's swift, which was first discovered by his friend John Kirk Townsend.

References

External links
 The Vaux Family Papers, including correspondence, journals, records and other miscellaneous papers, are available for research use at the Historical Society of Pennsylvania.

1811 births
1882 deaths
American mineralogists
Burials at Laurel Hill Cemetery (Philadelphia)
Members of the American Philosophical Society
Scientists from Philadelphia